The list of ministers for the Department of Public Works in the Government of Queensland, Australia, include:

Other roles 
Other politicians occupying important roles in the area of public works include:

References

Ministers of Australian states and territories
Queensland-related lists
Lists of political office-holders in Australia
Government of Queensland